Robert Marsham (1708–1797) was an English naturalist.

Robert Marsham may also refer to:
Sir Robert Marsham, 4th Baronet (1650–1703), English MP for Maidstone 
Robert Marsham, 1st Baron Romney (1685–1724), formerly 5th Baronet
Robert Marsham, 2nd Baron Romney (1712–1793), British peer and patron of the arts
Robert Bullock Marsham (1786–1880), English academic, Warden of Merton College, Oxford
Robert Marsham (cricketer) (1833–1913), English barrister, magistrate and cricketer